Jiaxiang may refer to:
Jiaxiang (家鄉), ancestral hometown of certain Chinese people or clan.
Jizang (嘉祥; 549–623 CE), also known as Jiaxiang, a Chinese monk
Jiaxiang County (嘉祥县), of Jining, Shandong, China
Jiaxiang Town (嘉祥镇), seat of Jiaxiang County
4760 Jia-xiang, main belt asteroid
Jackson Hole, China, also known as Jiaxiang (transliteration)